The 2019 Bound for Glory was a professional wrestling pay-per-view (PPV) event produced by Impact Wrestling. It took place on October 20, 2019, in Villa Park, Illinois. It was the 15th event under the Bound for Glory chronology. Wrestlers from Mexico's Lucha Libre AAA Worldwide (AAA) and Japan's Pro Wrestling Noah (NOAH), with which Impact Wrestling has partnerships, also appeared on the card.

Production

Background
At Slammiversary XVII, Impact Wrestling announced the date for Bound for Glory, with the Odeum Expo Center later announced as the event's venue.

Storylines 
The event will feature professional wrestling matches that will involved different wrestlers from pre-existing scripted feuds and storylines. Wrestlers will portray villains, heroes, or less distinguishable characters in scripted events that built tension and will culminated in a wrestling match or series of matches.

Reception 
Bound for Glory received mixed reviews. Nolan Howell of Canoe.ca declared that "There were some moments to be happy about on this show. The ladder match, the main event, and Elgin vs. Marufuji delivered. They left themselves a lot of room to book between Callihan & oVe, Cage, Blanchard, and potential to build other winners like Ace Austin".

Larry Csonka from 411mania further stated that "Impact Bound for Glory 2019 was a good but uneven show with a slow start but later developed into a really fun show. I think they may have missed an opportunity but not having Sami and Tessa win big here, as Sami is their best heel by a mile, while Tessa is the biggest star they have right now. If you're cherry picking, check out the ladder match, Elgin vs. Marufuji, and Sami vs Cage."

Jason Powell from Pro Wrestling Dot Net commented on the main event as being a "solid main event that lacked drama. Both guys worked hard and put their bodies on the line, but they never sold me on Callihan’s near falls for some reason. The overall show featured strong effort and some insane moments. Here’s hoping that the company moving into its run on AXS TV means next year’s BFG will feel bigger".

Results

Call Your Shot Gauntlet entrances and eliminations

See also
 2019 in professional wrestling

Notes

References

External links
 impactwrestling.com

Bound for Glory (wrestling pay-per-view)
Professional wrestling in the Chicago metropolitan area
2010s in Chicago
2019 in Illinois
Events in Villa Park, Illinois
October 2019 events in the United States
2019 Impact Wrestling pay-per-view events